Vicki Lester (born Dorothy Gertrude Day; April 7, 1915 – May 7, 2001) was an American actress. She is best known for appearing in Sky Giant (1938), The Mad Miss Manton (1938) and The Lone Rider and the Bandit (1942).

Biography
Born Dorothy Day, Lester took her stage name from Janet Gaynor's character in A Star Is Born (1937). The name change was suggested by Mervyn LeRoy and approved by David Selznick. Alas, she never made the grade as a 'star' in her own right. 

Lester attended schools in Manhattan and originally planned to design clothes for a career. She was a student of music and art, and she gained notability as a pianist. She became a model for artists and photographers, leading to her being named one of the "Twelve Most Photographed Girls in America". She was "seen in hundreds of advertisements and on scores of magazine covers".

Lester died in May 2001 in Beverly Hills, California at the age of 86.

Filmography

Film

References

Bibliography 
 Stella Star, Vicki Lester, May 31, 2016

External links 

Rotten Tomatoes profile

1915 births
2001 deaths
People from New York City
Actresses from New York City
American film actresses
20th-century American actresses